San Nicolás del Real Camino is a village under the local government of the municipality of Moratinos, Palencia, Spain.

References

Populated places in the Province of Palencia